The European Kendo Federation (EKF) is the member of the International Kendo Federation which is responsible for the European zone. The EKF is the overall organization for the Japanese martial arts Kendo, Jōdō and Iaido in Europe.

European Kendo Championships

European kendo championships have been held since 1974, with the first taking place in England. The European championship is held every year, except in those years in which there is a world championship (these occur every 3 years).

European Iaido Championship
The European Iaido Championship is held every year.

European Jodo Championship
The European Jodo Championship is held every year.

Member countries
The following is a partial list of countries that are members of the EKF.
Armenia Kendo is promoted by the National Kendo Federation of Armenia.
Austria The Austrian Kendo Association.
Belgium Kendo is promoted by the A.B.K.F., All Belgium Kendo Federation.
Bulgaria Kendo, iaido and jodo are promoted by the B.K.F., Bulgarian Kendo Federation.
Croatia Kendo is promoted by the H.K.S., Hrvatski Kendo Savez.
Czech Republic Kendo is promoted by the C.K.F., Czech Kendo Federation.
Denmark Danish Kendo Federation (Dansk Kendo Forbund, DKF).
Estonia Kendo is promoted by the Estonian Kendo Federation (EsKF).
Finland Kendo is promoted by the Finnish Kendo Association.
France After the end of World War II, many masters of kendo visited France and introduced kendo in the 1950s. The first French kendo championship was held in 1959. Comité National de Kendo
Georgia Kendo is promoted by the Georgian Kendo Association.
Germany DKenB - Deutscher Kendo Bund e.V. (DKenB).
Greece Kendo in Greece is promoted by the Hellenic Kendo Iaido Naginata Federation HKINF.
Hungary Kendo is promoted by the Hungarian Kendo Federation (HKF). 
Italy Kendo is promoted by the C.I.K., Confederazione Italiana Kendo.
Republic of Ireland Kendo is promoted by Kendo na hÉireann (KnhÉ).
Israel Kendo, Iaido and Jodo are promoted by the Israel Kendo and Budo Federation.
Latvia
Lithuania
Luxembourg Shobukai Kendo Luxembourg (SKL).
Malta Kendo is promoted by the Maltese Kendo Federation .
Moldova
Montenegro
Netherlands Kendo is promoted by the NKR, Dutch Kendo Renmei.
North Macedonia Kendo is promoted by the Macedonian Kendo - Iaido Federation (MKIF).
Norway
Poland Kendo is promoted by Polish Kendo Federation.
Portugal Kendo is promoted by Associação Portuguesa de Kendo (APK), which is affiliated with the European Kendo Federation and the International Kendo Federation.
Romania Kendo is promoted by Romanian Kendo, Iaido and Jodo Clubs Association (RKIJCA), which is affiliated with the European Kendo Federation and the International Kendo Federation.
Russia Kendo is promoted by Russian Kendo Federation.
Serbia Kendo is promoted by the Serbian Kendo Federation.
Slovakia Kendo is promoted by the Slovenská kendo federácia. 
Slovenia 
Spain Kendo is promoted by the Real Federacion Española de Judo y Deportes Asociados.
Sweden Kendo is promoted by the Swedish Kendo Federation.
Switzerland The Swiss Kendo & Iaido SJV/ASJ was founded in 1967.
Turkey Kendo is promoted by Turkish Kendo Association in Turkey. Dojos are Oraisha Dojo and Ankara Kendo Iaido Association in Ankara, Katsuninkan Istanbul, Bogazici Kendo Club and Istanbul Kendo Club in Istanbul.  A community site Kendo-Turkiye represents Turkish Kenshi.
Ukraine Kendo is promoted by the Ukrainian Kendo Federation.
United Kingdom Kendo was first seen in the UK in 1885 at the Japanese Village in Knightsbridge. The British Kendo Association, which is affiliated to the International Kendo Federation promotes Kendo in the UK.

External links
 Official web site of European Kendo Federation (EKF)

Kendo organizations